
 is a list of notable media commentators and writers on the sport of cricket from around the world.

A number of famous players have had a second career as writers or commentators. However, many commentators never played the game at a professional level, yet they have gone on to become famous names associated with the game. The following is a list of the cricket commentators, including name, nationality, Broadcaster/Publication and other careers.

See also
 ABC Radio National and Timeline of Australian radio
 BBC Radio and Timeline of the BBC

Notes

Bibliography

References

Further reading

External links 
 Wisden Cricketers' Almanack and the Wisden online archive
 Test Match Special Website
 Cricinfo Website

+
Commentators
Cricket on the radio
Cricket on television